Aníbal Luis Paz Piuma (21 May 1917 – 21 March 2013) was a Uruguayan footballer who played as a goalkeeper for the Uruguay national team.

From 1939 to 1953 he played for Club Nacional de Football, winning the Uruguayan championship nine times (1939, 40, 41, 42, 43, 46, 47, 50 and 52). He was part of Uruguay's championship winning team at the 1950 FIFA World Cup.

References

External links
Aníbal Paz's profile
Aníbal Paz's obituary

1917 births
2013 deaths
Uruguayan footballers
Uruguay international footballers
1950 FIFA World Cup players
FIFA World Cup-winning players
Liverpool F.C. (Montevideo) players
C.A. Bella Vista players
Club Nacional de Football players
Racing Club de Montevideo players
Association football goalkeepers
Copa América-winning players